The 1974 World Amateur Snooker Championship was the sixth edition of the tournament that later became known as the IBSF World Snooker Championship. The 1974 tournament was played in Dublin from 1 to 16 December 1974. Defending champion Ray Edmonds defeated Geoff Thomas 11–9 in the final to retain the title.

Tournament summary
The first World Amateur Snooker Championship was held in 1963. Ray Edmonds, who won the title in 1972, was the defending champion for 1974.

The tournament was held in Dubin from 1 to 16 December 1974. There were two nine-player round-robin groups, with the top four players from each group progressing to the quarter-finals. The quarter-finals onwards were played as a knockout tournament.

Ray Edmonds played Geoff Thomas in the final, which was held on 15 and 16 December, Edmonds led 5–2 after the first . In the next session, Thomas took a 7–6 lead before Edmonds levelled the score.  In the final session, Edmonds moved into a 9–7 lead before Thomas equalised at 9–9. Edmonds won the next two frames to achieve victory at 11–9.

Alwyn Lloyd made the highest  of the tournament, 104, during the group stage.

Qualifying groups
The final tables are shown below. Players in bold qualified for the next round.

Group A

Group B

Knockout
Players in bold denote match winners.

Final
Scores in bold indicate winning  scores. *Denotes frame won on a

References

Snooker amateur tournaments
International sports competitions hosted by Ireland
1974 in snooker